The International Conference on Surface Plasmon Photonics (SPP) is a biennial conference series in the field of plasmonics, including electron-plasmon interactions; energy harvesting; graphene, mid-IR, and THz plasmonics; near-field instrumentation; novel plasmonic materials; particle manipulations; plasmonic, metasurface, and metamaterial devices; sensors and transducers for biomedical applications; ultrafast and nonlinear phenomena; and quantum plasmonics.

Special issues
Several scientific journals have published special issues reporting results from recent SPP conferences:
SPP6: 
SPP7: 
SPP8: 
SPP9: Mortensen, N. Asger;  Berini, Pierre; Levy, Uriel; Bozhevolnyi, Sergey I. (2020-02-04). "Proceedings of 9th International Conference on Surface Plasmon Photonics (SPP9)". Nanophotonics 9 (2): 245 (2020). doi:10.1515/nanoph-2019-0532

References

Physics conferences
Biennial events
Recurring events established in 2001
Plasmonics